Michelle Thompson is a Canadian politician, who was elected to the Nova Scotia House of Assembly in the 2021 Nova Scotia general election. She represents the riding of Antigonish as a member of the Progressive Conservative Association of Nova Scotia.

Prior to her election to the legislature, Thompson worked as a registered nurse.

Thompson was sworn in as the Minister for Health and Wellness on August 31, 2021.

Electoral record

References

Year of birth missing (living people)
Living people
Progressive Conservative Association of Nova Scotia MLAs
Women MLAs in Nova Scotia
Nova Scotia Ministers of Health
Members of the Executive Council of Nova Scotia
21st-century Canadian politicians
21st-century Canadian women politicians
Canadian nurses
People from Antigonish County, Nova Scotia
Canadian women nurses